In probability theory and statistics, the normal-Wishart distribution (or Gaussian-Wishart distribution) is a multivariate four-parameter family of continuous probability distributions. It is the conjugate prior of a multivariate normal distribution with unknown mean and precision matrix (the inverse of the covariance matrix).

Definition
Suppose

has a multivariate normal distribution with mean  and covariance matrix , where

has a Wishart distribution. Then 
has a normal-Wishart distribution, denoted as

Characterization

Probability density function

Properties

Scaling

Marginal distributions

Posterior distribution of the parameters 
After making  observations , the posterior distribution of the parameters is

where

Generating normal-Wishart random variates 
Generation of random variates is straightforward:
 Sample  from a Wishart distribution with parameters  and 
 Sample  from a multivariate normal distribution with mean  and variance

Related distributions 
 The normal-inverse Wishart distribution is essentially the same distribution parameterized by variance rather than precision.
 The normal-gamma distribution is the one-dimensional equivalent.
 The multivariate normal distribution and Wishart distribution are the component distributions out of which this distribution is made.

Notes

References 
 Bishop, Christopher M. (2006). Pattern Recognition and Machine Learning. Springer Science+Business Media.

Multivariate continuous distributions
Conjugate prior distributions
Normal distribution